Entranceway at Main Street at High Park Boulevard is a suburban residential subdivision entranceway built about 1916 by developer Charles S. Burkhardt.  It is located on Main Street (New York State Route 5) at Eggertsville in the town of Amherst within Erie County.  It consists of tall and short stone posts, corresponding quarter-height stone walls, and accent light fixtures set on either side of the streets' intersecting corners.

It was added to the National Register of Historic Places in 2009.

See also
 Entranceway at Main Street at Darwin Drive

References

Buildings and structures on the National Register of Historic Places in New York (state)
Buildings and structures completed in 1916
Buildings and structures in Erie County, New York
National Register of Historic Places in Erie County, New York